Hoplolaimus seinhorsti is a plant pathogenic nematode affecting pigeonpea.

See also 
 List of pigeonpea diseases

References

External links 
 Nemaplex, University of California - Hoplolaimus seinhorsti

Tylenchida
Agricultural pest nematodes
Vegetable diseases
Nematodes described in 1958